The Cotswold style of architecture is a style based on houses from the Cotswold region of England, and is sometimes called the storybook style. Cotswold houses often have a prominent chimney, often near the front door of the house. Other notable features include king mullions and steep roofs.

The Cotswold style emerged during the late 16th century and flourished throughout the 17th century. During the second and third decades of the twentieth century, the Cotswold style reached its zenith of popularity.

Cotswold architecture is a subtype of the Tudor Revival house style, and it likely came to the United States as a result of renewed interest in medieval housing styles.

Influences 
The Cotswold style of architecture is characterized by simplicity. The original Cotswold cottages were built for rural laborers, including farmers who reared sheep. Additionally, the rural location of the Cotswold region limited access to building materials.

The Cotswold style later came to be influenced by the Classical style of architecture. These influences led to changes in the exteriors as well as interiors of Cotswold-style buildings. Classical influences to the exteriors included the use of stucco on walls, which often replaced the limewash on original buildings. The interiors also changed, as Cotswold-style buildings came to have higher and wider lights and “loftier” rooms.

Structural elements 
The features of the Cotswold style are primarily identifiable through the use of specific materials. In the Cotswold region, oolite limestone and hard wood are abundant. Lead, on the other hand, was scarce during throughout the 17th and 18th centuries, so it is not utilized in any traditional buildings of the Cotswold style.

Exteriors 

The leading feature of Cotswold architecture is the grouping of the gables. Since lead was not available, slate was used in its place.  Henry Ford is noted to have appreciated the "distinctive architectural style and attractive weathered appearance of typical Cotswold buildings," whose stone elements "all blended together unbroken by other visible construction materials." Due to the steepness of the roofs, most original Cotswold cottages had dormer windows and were not waterproof. Occasionally, lead was employed in gutter systems around the roof. As a result of the roof angles, roofs made with pseudo-thatch, steep arch gables, and arched doorways are all common features of the Cotswold style.

Like the roofs, the walls of Cotswold residences were susceptible to the elements. Though the walls were thick, they were hollow and filled with rocks and "rubbish" and were not reinforced with any binding materials.

The king mullion is a common element of the Cotswold style. The windows of Cotswold cottages were glazed with lead. In smaller structures, the windows were the only elements in which lead was used.

Interiors 
Buildings of the Cotswold style typically have one or two large fireplaces, depending on the size and function of the building. The fireplaces both release into a chimney. The interiors of the chimneys as well as the mantles are made of stone.

The rooms of residence constructed in the Cotswold style are often small and irregularly shaped. The floorplan of a Cotswold cottage is generally bisected by a staircase, and the bedrooms are on the first floor. These staircases, along with the internal walls, are made of wood. Traditionally, oak, chestnut, and beech, all native to the Cotswold region, were used.

Examples

In England 
Coln St. Aldwyns

In the United States 

 Rufus Arndt House, Wisconsin
 Rose Cottage at the Henry Ford

In literature 

 Dorset Academy, the setting of Richard Yates' A Good School and based on Avon Old Farms School, the preparatory school attended by the author.

See also 

 Storybook house
 Tudor architecture

External links
 About architecture

References